2001 Nagoya Grampus Eight season

Competitions

Domestic results

J.League 1

Emperor's Cup

J.League Cup

International results

Asian Cup Winners' Cup
Nagoya Grampus Eight qualified for this tournament as winners of the 1999 Emperor's Cup
Second Round

Quarterfinals

Player statistics

Other pages
 J.League official site

Nagoya Grampus Eight
Nagoya Grampus seasons